Rehydration may refer to: 

 Fluid replacement therapy, which may use several routes.
 Restoring water content in previously dehydrated objects.
Rehydration (web development), also called hydration

See also
Hydration (disambiguation)